The Sin of a Mother (Spanish:El pecado de una madre) is a 1944 Mexican film. It stars Adriana Lamar, Ramón Pereda and Carlos Orellana.

External links
 

1944 films
1940s Spanish-language films
Mexican black-and-white films
1940s Mexican films